Bergier is a French surname. Notable people with the surname include:

 Jacques Bergier (1912–1978), Russo-French chemical engineer, spy and author
 Jean-François Bergier (1931–2009), Swiss historian
 Nicolas Bergier (fl. 17th century), French archaeologist
 Nicolas-Sylvestre Bergier (1718–1790), Catholic theologian

See also
 Bergier commission, on Switzerland's role in World War II

French-language surnames